Vanzosaura rubricauda, the red-tailed vanzosaur or redtail tegu, is a non-venomous species of lizard in the family Gymnophthalmidae. It is found in Bolivia, Argentina, Paraguay, and Brazil.

References

Vanzosaura
Reptiles described in 1902
Taxa named by George Albert Boulenger